No Excuses may refer to:

Books
 No Excuses (book), a 2010 book by Gloria Feldt
 No Excuses, a 2005 autobiographical book by Kyle Maynard

Film and TV
 No Excuses, a 1983 television series, whose some episodes were written by Barrie Keeffe
 No Excuses, a competing team from the 2010 reality television series, Money Hungry
 No Excuses, a subtitle for the thirteenth season of The Biggest Loser (2012)
 MFC 9: No Excuses, one of Maximum Fighting Championship events in 2006
 "No Excuses", an approach used by an American principal, Gregory Hodge

Music
 "No Excuses" (Alice in Chains song)
 "No Excuses" (Meghan Trainor song)
 "No Excuses" (Bru-C song)
 "No Excuses", a song from The Latest Fashion, a 2011 album by Attack! Attack!
 "No Excuses", a song from Needtobreathe's 2016 album, Hard Love